The  '2020/21 season'  of the  ' Volleyball Bundesliga of Women'  began on October 3, 2020 and ended with the last playoff final game on April 24, 2021. Since the  2019/20 season was canceled due to the  COVID-19 pandemic, there was no defending champion. The  Dresdner SC prevailed in the playoff final against Allianz MTV Stuttgart and thus became German champions.

Teams 
This season the following eleven teams played in the first division:
<! - sorted alphabetically ->
 Ladies in Black Aachen
  Dresdner SC
 Black and White Erfurt
 USC Münster
  SC Potsdam
  SSC Palmberg Schwerin
 NawaRo Straubing
 Allianz MTV Stuttgart
  VfB Suhl Lotto Thuringia
 Rote Raben Vilsbiburg
 1. VC Wiesbaden

There was no newcomer. The German youth team VC Olympia Berlin played again this season in the  2. Bundesliga North.

Main round 
The women's Bundesliga was made up of eleven teams in the 2020/21 season, which initially competed against each other in the two rounds. There was no relegation.

Results 
Because of the COVID-19 pandemic in Germany, numerous games had to be postponed to another date.

table 
Since the 2013/14 season, the following rule of points has been in force for the DVV's game operations: three points are awarded for a 3-0 or 3-1 win, two points for a 3-2 win and two points for a 2-3 defeat one point and no point for a 1-3 or 3-0 defeat. In the event of a tie, the number of games won first decides, then the set quotient (division method) and finally the ball point quotient (division method).

Play-offs 
The teams in the first eight places qualified for the playoffs. Except for the final ( Best-of-Five-Modus) all games were played in  Best-of-Three-Modus.

Venues

Weblinks 
 Volleyball-Bundesliga

German women's volleyball players
Volleyball in Germany